David Brearley (often misspelled as Brearly) (June 11, 1745 – August 16, 1790) was an American Founding Father, Chief Justice of the Supreme Court of New Jersey, a delegate from New Jersey to the Constitutional Convention of 1787, which drafted the United States Constitution, a signer of the United States Constitution, and a United States district judge of the United States District Court for the District of New Jersey.

Education and career

Born on June 11, 1745, to Mary and David Brearely Sr. (1703–1785) in Lawrence Township, New Jersey, Province of New Jersey, British America, Brearley attended the College of New Jersey (now Princeton University) and read law. He was in private practice in Allentown, New Jersey until 1776.

Opposition to British colonial rule and military service

Prior to the start of the American Revolution, Brearley was on one occasion arrested for his opposition to the rule of the British Parliament but was freed by a mob. With the outbreak of the Revolutionary War, Brearley was at first a captain in the Monmouth County militia after having spent many years speaking out against the Parliamentary absolutism. He eventually rose to the rank of colonel in Nathaniel Heard's New Jersey militia brigade. From 1776 to 1779 he served in the New Jersey Line of the Continental Army, seeing action at Brandywine, Germantown, and Monmouth.

Chief Justice of the Supreme Court of New Jersey

Brearley was chief justice of the Supreme Court of New Jersey from 1779 to 1789. He decided on the famous Holmes v. Walton case where he ruled that the judiciary had the authority to declare whether laws were unconstitutional.

Constitutional Convention

While at the Constitutional Convention in 1787, Brearley was Chairman of the Committee on Postponed Parts, which played a substantial role in shaping the final document. The committee addressed questions related to the taxes, war-making, patents and copyrights, relations with Native American tribes, and Franklin's compromise to require money bills to originate in the House of Representatives. The biggest issue they addressed was the presidency, and the final compromise was written by James Madison with the committee's input. They adopted the earlier plan for choosing the president by the Electoral College and settled on the method of choosing the president if no candidate had an Electoral College majority, which many such as Madison thought would be "nineteen times out of twenty". The committee also shortened the president's term from seven years to four years, freed him to seek re-election, and moved impeachment trials from the courts to the Senate. They also created the vice president, whose only role was to succeed the president and preside over the Senate. This also transferred important powers from the Senate to the president, who was given the power (which had been given to the senate by Rutledge's committee) to make treaties and appoint ambassadors. He ultimately signed the finished Constitution.

Federal judicial service

He was confirmed by the United States Senate on September 25, 1789, and received his commission on September 26, 1789. His service terminated on August 16, 1790, due to his death in Trenton.

Death 
He is interred in the churchyard of Saint Michael's Episcopal Church in Trenton, and a cenotaph was placed there in 1924.

Legacy

At the close of the Revolutionary War, Brearly became one of the founding members of the Society of the Cincinnati in the State of New Jersey and served as the state society's vice president from 1783 until his death in 1790. In 1789, he was elected to the American Philosophical Society.

David Brearley High School in Kenilworth, New Jersey was named in his honor. Brearley Street in Madison, Wisconsin, is named in his honor. Brearley Crescent in Waldwick, New Jersey, is named in his honor. Brearley Lodge No.2 Masonic Lodge in Bridgeton, New Jersey, is named in his honor.

References

Sources
 
 Biography
 From NARA
 Colonial Hall Biography

External links
   Brearley House, Lawrence Historical Society

Further reading
 Scarinci, Donald. David Brearley and the Making of the United States Constitution. New Jersey Heritage Press, 2005.

Signers of the United States Constitution
1745 births
1790 deaths
Continental Army officers from New Jersey
Chief Justices of the Supreme Court of New Jersey
Justices of the Supreme Court of New Jersey
Judges of the United States District Court for the District of New Jersey
18th-century American Episcopalians
Princeton University alumni
United States federal judges appointed by George Washington
18th-century American judges
People of colonial New Jersey
Burials in New Jersey
People of New Jersey in the American Revolution
Founding Fathers of the United States